Anisoptera scaphula is a species of plant in the family Dipterocarpaceae. It is native to Bangladesh, Peninsular Malaysia, Laos, Myanmar and Thailand.

Description
The trunk is prominently buttressed. It occurs on almost flat areas, on undulating land and in valleys at elevations between sea level and 700 m, and is shade tolerant in youth. Its timber is used for general light construction.

Conservation
Anisoptera scaphula has been assessed as Endangered on the IUCN Red List. The species is threatened by logging for timber and conversion of forests for agriculture. In Thailand and Malaysia, the species is not found outside of protected areas.

References

scaphula
Flora of Bangladesh
Flora of Peninsular Malaysia
Flora of Laos
Flora of Myanmar
Flora of Thailand
Taxonomy articles created by Polbot